Rana Majid Haq Khan (born 11 February 1983), better known as Majid Haq, is a Scottish cricketer. He is a left-handed batsman and an off spin bowler. He has represented Scotland at Under 17, Under 19 and Under 23 levels, making his debut for the senior side on 20 July 2002 in a European Championship match against an England Board XI. He was a member of the Scottish squad for the 2007 World Cup in the West Indies. Haq is a cousin of fellow cricketer Omer Hussain. Both Hussain and Haq have played for Kelburne Cricket Club, Ferguslie Cricket Club and Clydesdale Cricket Club. He now plays for the Ayrshire-based club, Prestwick Cricket Club. Haq is of Pakistani descent.

Education
Haq was brought up in Paisley, going to Todholm Nursery and South Primary School in his early life. He then spent 6 years at Castlehead High School, then continuing his education at Reid Kerr College. Haq is a graduate in Accountancy, obtaining his honours degree from the University of the West of Scotland, formerly University of Paisley. Haq is currently working with an accountancy firm.

Cricketing career
Haq and cousin Omer Hussain grew up in the same house in Hunterhill, going to the same school and cricket clubs, firstly the Old Grammarians, then Kelburne, where they were coached by Roddy McLelland. At the end of 2002, Omer moved to rivals, Ferguslie Cricket Club after Roddy McLelland retired from coaching. Haq soon followed after the next season. Haq became involved in the game through his family who all played cricket, with him influencing his cousin Omer who he played with as a youngster and who has played for Scotland at various age groups – and is also a full Scottish international cricketer.

Haq regards the highlight of his cricketing career to date as beating Durham and Lancashire in the National League in 2003 and also participating in the 2007 Cricket World Cup held in the West Indies.

Haq and his cousin Omer Hussain were selected for the provisional World Cup squad which took take place in 2007 in the West Indies. They were both told to improve their fitness if they wanted to maintain their space in the squad. Haq was selected for the tour of Dubai and Kenya, and for the World Cricket League Division One tournament in which they were runners up making way for them to contest in the 2007 Twenty20 World Championship being held in South Africa later 2007. His cousin Omer however was not selected and lost his place in the final world cup squad to fellow cricketer Glenn Rogers.

Haq trialed with Warwickshire County Cricket Club in March 2008.

Racism allegations

Haq was sent home from the 2015 World Cup in Australia after suggesting that his omission from the Scotland team may have been on racial grounds.  In November 2021 he called for an investigation into possible racism in Scottish cricket.

References

Sources
Magical Majid lights up Saltires
The game that put Scotland in a spin
Durham v Scotland-4 May 2003-Chester-le-Street-National Cricket League
Majid refuses to get carried away by spin
Majid circle is split but Scots spinner hopes to cast spell on Pakistan
'Slim Pickings'
Big shots Cousins are determined to make the most of shock call-
Young, gifted and Scots: ten to watch in 2007
Scots eager for brave new world
Trim spinner Haq keen to shine in Kenyan challenge
Majic Touch
Scots book Twenty20 place after Haq heroics
Majid’s 71 runs take Saltires to the final
Scotland Player Majid Haq Says Beating Australia In Their World Cup Group Will Be The Same As Faroes Beating Brazil In Football
Haq hungry for his just deserts
We can Haq it against Aussies
Scot's Haq covers up World cup shirt
World Cup cricketer ducks out of delivering for brewery sponsor
Scotland`s Muslim cricketer covers up beer logo
Haq hits out over Cricket Scotland's foreign policy
Haq Ploy Hacks Off Umpires
Haq: I'm So Up For Pakistan City Date
Hussain’s 121 offers hope of home win
MAJID: Cousin Omer Can Help Saltires Maul The Bears
Skipper Watson backs Haq to make Saltires forget their woes

External links

Majid Haq Personal Profile
Cricket Scotland

Scottish cricketers
Living people
1983 births
Scotland One Day International cricketers
Scotland Twenty20 International cricketers
Scottish people of Pakistani descent
British Asian cricketers
Sportspeople from Paisley, Renfrewshire
Cricketers at the 2015 Cricket World Cup
Cricketers at the 2007 Cricket World Cup
British sportspeople of Pakistani descent
Alumni of the University of the West of Scotland
Clydesdale CC players
Kelburne CC players
Royal High Corstorphine CC players